Crematogaster chungi is a species of ant in tribe Crematogastrini. It was described by William Louis Brown Jr. in 1949.

References

chungi
Insects described in 1949